In music, Op. 95 stands for Opus number 95. Compositions that are assigned this number include:

 Arnold – Symphony No. 6
 Beethoven – String Quartet No. 11
 Dvořák – Symphony No. 9
 Schumann – 3 Gesänge
 Stanford – Serenade in F major
 Strauss – Idyllen
 Tcherepnin – Chinese Songs